The David Robbins House is a historic house at 26285 Broadkill Road in Milton, Delaware.  The two story vernacular wood-frame house was built c. 1850, and is one of a few from the period to survive in the area.  The house was bought in 1925 by Charles G. Jones, an innovator in Delaware's holly industry.

The house was listed on the National Register of Historic Places in 2013.

See also
National Register of Historic Places listings in Sussex County, Delaware

References

Houses on the National Register of Historic Places in Delaware
Houses completed in 1850
Houses in Sussex County, Delaware
National Register of Historic Places in Sussex County, Delaware